Year 1340 (MCCCXL) was a leap year starting on Saturday (link will display the full calendar) of the Julian calendar.

Events 
 January 26 – King Edward III of England is declared King of France.
 April 8 – Marinid galleys, under the command of Muhammad ibn Ali al-Azafi, rout the Castellan fleet, off the coast of Algeciras.
 April–July – Trapezuntine Civil War: An abortive uprising occurs against Irene Palaiologina of Trebizond, the first of a number of coups, revolts, and succession disputes.
 June 7 – Rotterdam is officially declared a city.
 June 24
 Hundred Years' War: Battle of Sluys – The English fleet, under the command of Edward III of England, battles the French fleet, under that of Admiral Hugues Quiéret and treasurer Nicolas Béhuchet, assisted by Genoese mercenary galleys under Egidio Bocanegra, on the Low Countries coast. The French fleet is virtually destroyed, and both of its commanders are killed.
 Valdemar IV of Denmark, son of deceased King Christopher II, is elected to the throne, following 8 years of interregnum.
 July 26 – Hundred Years' War: French defeat the English at the Battle of Saint-Omer.
 September 25 – Hundred Years' War: The temporary Truce of Espléchin is signed between England and France.
 October 30 – Battle of Río Salado in Spain: The kings of Castile and Portugal defeat the Nasrid ruler of Granada and his Moroccan allies.
 Europe has about 74 million inhabitants.
An epidemic in northern Italy, recorded by Augustine of Trent in his Epistola astrologica
Bohemian Crusade: The Church authorizes a military expedition against heretics. 
The Monarchy of Japan reaches its 2000 year anniversary (according to traditional starting dates).

Births 
 March 5 – Cansignorio della Scala, Lord of Verona (d. 1375)
 March 6 – John of Gaunt, 1st Duke of Lancaster (d. 1399)
 August – Haakon VI, king of Norway 1355–1380 and of Sweden 1362–1364 (d. 1380)
 October – Geert Groote, Dutch founder of the Brethren of the Common Life (d. 1384)
 November 30 – John, Duke of Berry, son of John II of France (d. 1416)
 date unknown
 Enguerrand VII, Lord of Coucy (d. 1397)
 John of Nepomuk, saint of Bohemia (d. 1393)
 Narayana Pandit, Indian mathematician (d. 1400)
 probable 
 Margaret Drummond, queen consort of Scotland (d. 1375)
 Philip van Artevelde, Flemish patriot (d. 1382)

Deaths 
 March 31 – Ivan I of Moscow (b. 1288)
 April 5 – William Melton, English archbishop 
 April 6 – Emperor Basil Megas Komnenos of Trebizond
 April 7 – Bolesław Jerzy II of Mazovia (b. 1308)
 December 2 – Geoffrey le Scrope, Chief Justice of King Edward III of England
 December 4 – Henry Burghersh, English bishop and chancellor (b. 1292)
 December 20 – John I, Duke of Bavaria (b. 1329)
 date unknown – Simonida, queen consort of Serbia (b. 1294)

References